The 2023 Brazilian Jiu-Jitsu European Championship, officially called the 2023 European Jiu-Jitsu IBJFF Championship, was an international jiu-jitsu tournament organised in Europe by the International Brazilian Jiu-Jitsu Federation (IBJFF). It was held between 23 and 29 January 2023 in Paris, France.

Location
Paris was selected as the host city for the first time as the European championship was held in Lisbon, Portugal until 2019 and in Rome in 2022.

Schedule
Pre schedule:

Medal summary

Men's medallists 
Adult male black belt results

Women's medallists 
Adult female black belt results

Teams results 
Results by Academy

See also 
Asian IBJJF Jiu-Jitsu Championship
Pan IBJJF Jiu-Jitsu Championship
World IBJJF Jiu-Jitsu Championship
European IBJJF Jiu-Jitsu Championship

Notes

References 

Brazilian jiu-jitsu competitions
Brazilian jiu-jitsu European Championship
Brazilian jiu-jitsu European Championship
Brazilian Jiu-Jitsu in France
International sports competitions hosted by France
Sports competitions in Paris
European Championship
Brazilian jiu-jitsu competitions in France
European Jiu-Jitsu Championship